The Lea Bridge Stadium was a football and speedway stadium on Lea Bridge Road in the Leyton area of London. It was the home ground of Clapton Orient between 1930 and 1937.

History
The stadium was originally a speedway venue, but also started hosting football matches in 1930 when Clapton Orient moved to the site, having been forced to leave their Millfields Road ground due to financial problems.

At the time that Orient moved to the ground, spectator facilities included a covered stand on the southern side of the ground and embankments around the remainder. The first League match played at the ground was a 3–1 win against Newport County on 3 September 1930 with 5,505 in attendance. A few weeks into the season, the Football League authorities notified the club that the gap between the edge of the pitch and the speedway track fence was too narrow, and that no more matches could be played at the ground until this was rectified. Whilst the works were carried out, Orient played two matches at Wembley Stadium; a 3–0 win over Brentford on 22 November (with an attendance of 10,300) and a 3–1 win against Southend United on 6 December (2,500).

Further improvements were later made to the ground, including a covered stand on the northern touchline and concrete terracing on the west, north and eastern sides of the stadium. The works increased the capacity to around 20,000, and Orient's record League crowd of 20,400 was set on 13 March 1937 when Millwall were beaten 1–0.

In 1937 Clapton Orient moved to Osborne Road (later renamed Brisbane Road). The stadium continued to be used for speedway for one more season, and then lay derelict until being finally demolished in the 1970s. The site later became an industrial estate.

See also
 Lea Bridge (speedway)

References

Defunct football venues in England
Leyton Orient F.C.
Defunct sports venues in London
Defunct speedway venues in England
English Football League venues